The Serie B 1959–60 was the twenty-eighth tournament of this competition played in Italy since its creation.

Teams
Mantova and Catanzaro had been promoted from Serie C, while Triestina and Torino had been relegated from Serie A.

Events
Consequently, to the reform of the professional football in Italy following the Belfast Disaster, the first-ever elimination of the Italy football team into the World Cup Qualifiers, both a third promotion and relegation was introduced.

Final classification

Results

Relegation tie-breaker

Taranto relegated to Serie C.

References and sources
Almanacco Illustrato del Calcio - La Storia 1898-2004, Panini Edizioni, Modena, September 2005

Serie B seasons
2
Italy